The Festival of the snake catchers (or snake-charmers) (Festa dei Serpari di Cocullo) is an annual festival held on May 1st in Cocullo, Italy in honour of St. Dominic, patron saint protecting against snakebite and toothache. Its origins date back to paganism and have roots in an ancient celebration in honour of the Roman goddess Angitia. The festival involves a procession carrying the statue of St. Dominic, draped with living snakes, through the streets of the village.

The celebration and its history 
After Mass, the statue of St. Dominic is brought out and paraded through the streets, completely  covered in snakes, followed by the Serpari (a hereditary brotherhood of local snake-charmers) who are also draped with snakes.  

This festival has pre-Christian roots and is related to a much older rite, that of the snake deity, Angitia. In pagan times, the snake-charmers were the priests at the sanctuary of Angitia and the snakes were associated with healing. Cocullo was the territory of the Marsi, known for their magic arts and power over serpents. 

The festival was nominated as a cultural ceremony to be protected by UNESCO

References

Province of L'Aquila
Festivals in Italy
Catholic holy days
Italian traditions